Stylogomphus is a genus of clubtails in the family Gomphidae. There are about 12 described species in Stylogomphus.

Species
These 12 species belong to the genus Stylogomphus:

 Stylogomphus albistylus (Hagen in Selys, 1878) i c g b (eastern least clubtail)
 Stylogomphus changi Asahina, 1968 c g
 Stylogomphus chunliuae Chao, 1954 c g
 Stylogomphus inglisi Fraser, 1922 c g
 Stylogomphus lawrenceae Yang & Davies, 1996 c g
 Stylogomphus lutantus Chao, 1983 c g
 Stylogomphus malayanus Sasamoto, 2001 c g
 Stylogomphus ryukyuanus Asahina, 1951 c g
 Stylogomphus shirozui Asahina, 1966 c g
 Stylogomphus sigmastylus Cook & Laudermilk, 2004 i c g b (interior least clubtail)
 Stylogomphus suzukii Matsumura in ..., 1926 c g
 Stylogomphus tantulus Chao, 1954 c g

Data sources: i = ITIS, c = Catalogue of Life, g = GBIF, b = Bugguide.net

References

Further reading

External links

 

Gomphidae
Articles created by Qbugbot